Waylon Reavis (born September 19, 1978) is an American musician best known for being a former vocalist for American heavy metal band Mushroomhead. He was in Mushroomhead from 2004-2015 and with them released three albums: Savior Sorrow (2006), Beautiful Stories for Ugly Children (2010), and Righteous and the Butterfly (2014).  He has also performed vocals for the Cleveland-based band Tenafly Viper and the alternative rock band 3 Quarters Dead. Reavis starred in the 2011 movie horror 13th Sign. He was a featured vocalist on the song "Open Wide" by Black Flood Diesel, "Personal Demons in the Void" by Underlined, and "Letting Go" by Amerakin Overdose.

In September 2016, Reavis announced that his new project A Killer's Confession had signed to Megadeth bassist David Ellefson's EMP Label Group, and that their debut album Unbroken would be released in 2017.

Mushroomhead 
Reavis joined Mushroomhead in 2004, taking over vocalist duties from Jason Popson. Reavis remained in the band even after J Mann announced his return in 2013. He is identified by his facepaint and masks, all consisting of a swallow on his forehead.

Reavis announced on his Facebook fan page on October 5, 2015, that he was leaving Mushroomhead.

 Savior Sorrow – 2006
 Beautiful Stories for Ugly Children – 2010
 The Righteous & the Butterfly – 2014

A Killer's Confession 
In September 2016, Reavis announced on Facebook, then via press release, that his new project A Killer's Confession had signed a deal with EMP Label Group, which would release their debut album Unbroken in the spring of 2017. The album was partially recorded and mixed at Kentucky's Third Sky Studio with Reavis and co-producers Thom Hazaert and Richard Easterling.

On Halloween 2016 AKC released their debut single "A Killer's Confession", featuring a guest performance by Korn guitarist Brian "Head" Welch.

The band, including guitarists Matt Trumpy and Paul E, and drummer Jon Dale, played their first shows in December 2016, with Dead By Wednesday, culminating in a hometown show at the Cleveland Agora on December 17.

Discography
 2017 – Unbroken
 2019 – The Indifference of Good Men
 2021 - Remember

Other work 
In March 2021, Reavis collaborated with electronic music producer Boom Kitty on the song It Takes Me, which was released as part of Beat Saber's fourth in-game original album.

References 

Living people
1978 births
American male singer-songwriters
American heavy metal singers
American rock songwriters
American industrial musicians
Nu metal singers
Singer-songwriters from Ohio
21st-century American singers
21st-century American male singers